Loch Killin is a small freshwater loch in the Monadhliath Mountains, in Highland, Scotland, United Kingdom.

Geography
This includes the neighbouring hamlet and abandoned former township of Easter Drummond. The Loch is part of a wider hydroelectricity scheme at Garrogie. There are a couple of hunting lodges in proximity to the lodge, specifically Garrogie lodge and Killin lodge, as well as several tracks through the valleys towards a wind farm in the Grampian Mountains.

Ecology
The waters of Loch Killin are home to the Haddy charr (Salvelinus killinensis), a species of char named after this loch. It is endemic to this lake as well as Loch Doine, and possibly Loch Builg.

Association
The Royal Navy frigate  was named after the loch.

References

Lochs of Highland (council area)
Freshwater lochs of Scotland